Bhaljibhai Ravjibhai Parmar was an Indian politician. He was elected to the Lok Sabha, the lower house of the Parliament of India.

References

External links
Official biographical sketch in Parliament of India website

Indian National Congress politicians
India MPs 1967–1970
India MPs 1971–1977
Lok Sabha members from Gujarat
1920 births
Year of death missing
Indian National Congress politicians from Gujarat